is a 2007 Japanese film directed by Yūichi Satō.

Plot
One year after the suicide of C-list model Kisaragi Miki, five of her fans come together for a commemorative meeting. They slowly come to the realization that her death did not occur the way they thought it did. The more they talk, the more the case takes shape in their minds, and the closer they come to the truth.

Cast
 Teruyuki Kagawa as Ichigo Musume
 Keisuke Koide as Snake		
 Shun Oguri as Iemoto		
 Yūsuke Santamaria	as Oda Yuji	
 Muga Tsukaji as Yasuo
 Kanako Sakai as Kisaragi Miki
 Raiki Yonemoto as the childhood version of Yasuo in photos.
 Joe Shishido

Awards and nominations
50th Blue Ribbon Awards
 Won: Best Film

References

External links

2007 drama films
2000s Japanese-language films
2007 films
Films directed by Yūichi Satō
2000s Japanese films